Cullum Branch is a stream in Warren County in the U.S. state of Missouri.

A variant spelling was "Cullom Branch". The stream has the name of Gram Cullom, a pioneer citizen.

See also
List of rivers of Missouri

References

Rivers of Warren County, Missouri
Rivers of Missouri